A knockout, in several sports, is a strike that renders an opponent unable to continue fighting.

Knockout may also refer to:

Sports and games 
 Knockout (game), a basketball-related activity
 Knock Out (Gottlieb pinball), a 1950 pinball machine
 Knock Out (kickboxing), a Japanese kickboxing promotion
 Knock Out (tabletop game), a tabletop game by the Milton Bradley Company
 "TNA Knockout", a term used by Total Nonstop Action Wrestling to refer to its female talent
 Technical knockout, a knockout called by an official for safety
 Knockout system
 Knockout tournament, a single-elimination tournament
 Knockout Cup (speedway), a British motorcycle speedway competition

Comics
 Knockout (UK comics), either of two British comic books
 Knockout (DC Comics), a comic book character
 Knock Out (Transformers: Prime), a fictional robot supervillain turned superhero
 Knockout, a Femme Fatales comics character

Literature 
 Knock-Out (novel), a Bulldog Drummond novel
 Knockout: Interviews with Doctors Who Are Curing Cancer – And How to Prevent Getting It in the First Place, a book by Suzanne Somers

Music 
 Knockout Entertainment, an American record label
 Knock Out (Bonfire album) (1991), album by the hard rock band Bonfire
 "Knockout" (Triple 8 song) (2003), a song by the British pop/rock group Triple 8
 "Twins (Knock Out)", a cover version by Super Junior
 "Knockout" (Lil Wayne song) (2010), song by Lil Wayne from his album Rebirth
 "K.O." (Pabllo Vittar song) (2017), song by Pabllo Vittar from her album Vai Passar Mal
 TKO (The Knock Out), 2018 album by Mya
 Knock Out!, a 1981 album by Toots and the Maytals
 "Knockout" (Bon Jovi song), song from 2016 album This House Is Not for Sale
 "Knock Out" (GD & TOP song), 2011 song by GD & TOP for their self-entitled album
 "Knockout" (2019), a song by Martin Tungevaag

Film and television 
 The Knockout, a 1914 Keystone Studios film with Fatty Arbuckle and Charlie Chaplin.
 The Knockout (1923 film), a 1923 British silent sports film directed by Alexander Butler
 The Knockout (1925 film), a silent drama directed by Lambert Hillyer
 Knockout (1935 film), a German sports film
 Knockout (1941 film), a 1941 American drama directed by William Clemens
 Knock Out (1943 film), a 1943 Italian crime film directed by Carmine Gallone
 Knockout (2000 film), an American film about a female boxer
 Knock Out (2010 film), an Indian Hindi-language action-thriller film
 Knockout (2011 film) or Born to Fight, a Canadian film
 Haywire (2011 film) or Knockout, a 2011 American film
 Knockout (game show), a 1977–78 NBC series hosted by Arte Johnson
 Knockout (Indonesian TV series), a game show
 The Knockout (Chinese TV series), a 2023 Chinese TV series directed by Xu Jizhou

Information technology 
 Knockout (web framework), a JavaScript library
 Image knockout, removing the background from an image

Material removal 
 Knock-outs, partially punched enclosure openings for optional removal
 Knockout punch, a metalworking tool
 Knock-out pot, a vapor–liquid separator

Other uses 
 Knockouts, an American salon chain
 Knockout CP Freshmart (born 1990), Thai boxer and former Muay Thai fighter
 Knock-out option, a barrier option in financial markets
 Knockout game, a criminally violent activity
 Gene knockout, molecular biology technique
 Operation Knockout, a military campaign
 Reversing type, also known as knocking out, a method of typographic printing

See also 
 Incapacitation (disambiguation)
Knockout gas
Knockout drops
 Knocking one out, a euphemism
 KO (disambiguation)
 Knock Yourself Out (disambiguation)
 Double knockout (disambiguation)
 Knockout game (disambiguation)